Ctenodactylus is a genus of rodent in the family Ctenodactylidae (comb rats or gundis). It contains the following species : 

 Common gundi - C. gundi
 Val's gundi - C. vali

References

 Dieterlen, F.  2005. Family Ctenodactylidae pp. 1536-1537 in D. E. Wilson and M. A. Reeder, eds. Mammal Species of the World, 3rd edition, p. 1536.

 
Rodent genera
 
Mammals described in 1830
Taxa named by John Edward Gray
Taxonomy articles created by Polbot